Els, also called Elsbach, is a river in the Rhön Mountains, Lower Franconia, Bavaria, Germany. It is a tributary of the Streu in Unsleben.

See also
List of rivers of Bavaria

References

Rivers of Bavaria
Rivers of Germany